Isidro B. Maiztegui (July 14, 1905 – May 29, 1996) was an Argentine composer who wrote a number of film scores.

Selected filmography
 The Circus Cavalcade (1945)
 Wake Up to Life (1945)
 Lost Kisses (1945)
 Madame Bovary (1947)
 From Man to Man (1949)
 The New Bell (1950)
 The Street Next to the Moon (1951)
 Comedians (1954)
 Andalusia Express (1956)
 The Legion of Silence (1956)
 Night and Dawn (1958)
 Vengeance (1958)
 Sonatas (1959)
 Kill and Be Killed (1962)

References

Bibliography
 Lorenzo J. Torres Hortelano. Directory of World Cinema: Spain. Intellect Books, 2011.

External links

1905 births
1996 deaths
Argentine composers
20th-century composers